Nemesis 2: Nebula is a 1995 science fiction film directed by Albert Pyun. The sequel to Nemesis (1992), it stars Sue Price, Tina Coté, Earl White, Jahi J.J. Zuri, and Chad Stahelski. Nemesis 2 was shot in Globe, Arizona. It was followed by Nemesis 3: Prey Harder and Nemesis 4: Death Angel, both released in 1996. 

A compilation version exists which combined the four Nemesis films into one 100-minute feature that Scanbox was going to release before the company went bankrupt in 2000. This version was released only in Eastern Europe in 2003, primarily in Poland.

Synopsis
73 years after Alex failed, humans have lost the Cyborg Wars and they are now slaves to the cyborg masters. Rebel scientists have developed a new DNA strain which could signal the end of the cyborgs, and it is injected it into a pregnant volunteer.

When the cyborgs learn of the woman and her baby, both are listed for termination. To escape, she steals a cyborg ship and is transported back in time to East Africa in 1980, where the mother is killed but the baby is saved. It takes 20 years, but a cyborg bounty hunter named Nebula eventually locates the young woman, named Alex, and travels back in time to terminate her.

Cast
 Sue Price as Alex
 Zachary Studer as Young Alex 
 Chad Stahelski as Nebula  
 Tina Coté as Emily  
 Earl White as Po / Juna  
 Jahi J.J. Zuri as Zumi / Rebel #2  
 Karen Studer as Zana  
 Sharon Bruneau as Lock  
 Debbie Muggli as Ditko   
 Dave Fisher as Oslo
 Richard Cetrone as Rebel Mercenary Soldier #1

Reception
One reviewer noted that the film appeared to have been an unrelated film involving aliens that was repurposed as a Nemesis sequel  and was critical of Price's performance, weak storyline and minimal relation to the original film, a theme that he later brought up in his review of the sequel.

References

External links
 

1990s American films
1990s English-language films
1990s science fiction action films
1995 films
1995 independent films
American independent films
American science fiction action films
American robot films
Cyborg films
Danish independent films
Danish science fiction action films
Films directed by Albert Pyun
Films about time travel
Films set in Africa
Nemesis (film series)
Robot films